Mikhail Maksimochkin (born 29 August 1993, in Nizhny Novgorod) is a Russian ski jumper.

Maksimochkin competed at the 2014 Winter Olympics for Russia. He placed 29th in the normal hill qualifying round, and 30th in the final.

Maksimochkin made his World Cup debut in November 2013. As of September 2014, his best finish is 5th, in a large hill event at Zakopane in 2013–14. His best World Cup overall finish is 54th, in 2013–14.

References

1993 births
Living people
Olympic ski jumpers of Russia
Ski jumpers at the 2014 Winter Olympics
Sportspeople from Nizhny Novgorod
Russian male ski jumpers
Universiade medalists in ski jumping
Universiade gold medalists for Russia
Universiade silver medalists for Russia
Universiade bronze medalists for Russia
Competitors at the 2013 Winter Universiade
Competitors at the 2015 Winter Universiade